"Monarchy of Roses" is a song from the Red Hot Chili Peppers' 2011 album I'm with You and the album's second single. The single is the follow-up to the number one hit, "The Adventures of Rain Dance Maggie". The single was released to radio and for download in the UK on October 7, 2011 and to radio in the United States on October 25, 2011.

In a September 17, 2011 interview on BBC Radio 2 with Anthony Kiedis and Chad Smith, the show's host, Justin Lee Collins broke the news that "Monarchy of Roses" would be the second single from the album and would be released on November 14, 2011. Neither Kiedis or Smith were even aware what song would be the next single and both seemed surprised during the interview. Despite the same date being also listed on the back of the promo single, the song was released weeks earlier to radio; however, the music video was, in fact, released on this date.

Music video
On October 4, 2011, the band began filming a music video for Monarchy of Roses. Drummer Chad Smith posted a photo of his drums in front of a green screen confirming that filming was underway.

The video was directed by Marc Klasfeld, who previously directed the video for "The Adventures of Rain Dance Maggie" and was inspired by the art work of Raymond Pettibon.

Pettibon, who is the brother of Black Flag guitarist Greg Ginn, is best known for his artwork for the Black Flag albums as well as the band's iconic four bars logo. Flea said of Pettibon that he has been a fan since he was a teenager and that his art was first seen as part of the hardcore punk rock scene in LA around 1980. Pettibon has since gone on to have a "transcendently beautiful and dynamic art career. Raymond Pettibon means a lot to us and we are honored to have made this collaboration with him."

On November 30, 2011, the band released a behind the scenes video of the making of "Monarchy of Roses".

Reception
Billboard calls the song a "mixed bag of new ideas" and that the band "hurt as much as they delight" with this song. Loudwire gave the song 4 out of 5 stars, commenting that the song is "structured around a tightly wound tension and release formula". They conclude that the song "has a real stadium (arcadium) feel to it, as it invites plenty of singalongs with its layers of harmony".

Live performances and promotion
"Monarchy of Roses" was performed at every show on the I'm with You World Tour as the opening song. The song was not played on the ensuing The Getaway World Tour and has not been played live by the band since.

Even though for many years the band has strongly fought against having their music used in commercials or other promotional advertisements, "Monarchy of Roses" appeared in a 2011 Japanese car commercial for the Nissan Elgrand.

Formats and track listings
Japanese single
 "Monarchy of Roses" (album version) – 4:14

UK promo single
 "Monarchy of Roses" (album version) – 4:14
 "Monarchy of Roses" (radio edit) – 3:43
 "Monarchy of Roses" (instrumental) – 4:12

European advance promo single
 "Monarchy of Roses" (album version) – 4:14
 "Monarchy of Roses" (radio edit) – 3:43

Personnel
Red Hot Chili Peppers
Anthony Kiedis – lead vocals
Josh Klinghoffer – guitar, backing vocals, synthesizer
Flea – bass
Chad Smith – drums

Additional musicians
Mauro Refosco – percussion
Lenny Castro – additional percussion

Charts

Weekly charts

Year-end charts

References

2011 singles
2011 songs
Red Hot Chili Peppers songs
Warner Records singles
Music videos directed by Marc Klasfeld
Songs written by Josh Klinghoffer
Songs written by Flea (musician)
Songs written by Chad Smith
Disco songs
American garage rock songs
American pop rock songs